Miodrag Miša Novaković (Belgrade, 1940) is a Serbian cineast, writer, cultural expert, film and TV director, screenwriter, critic, theorist, esthetist, director of several important Yugoslav film festivals and film pedagogue.

He is an expert on the life and work of Nikola Tesla, contributing through studies, essays, films and popularization.

Biography 
He is brother of important cultural figure of SFR Yugoslavia, Slobodan Novaković. Miodrag finished primary and grammar school in Belgrade. In 1967 he graduated from The Faculty of Law and in 1969 he graduated from The Theatre, Film and Radio Academy department for dramaturgy (now Faculty of dramatic arts), prof. Josip Kulundžić class.

Novaković was the head of the Film center of Dom pionira (today: Dečji kulturni centar Beograd, Children's cultural center Belgrade), from 1970–1972. He initiated and was a selector of the Film parade — the international festival of films for children and the youth, from 1971 to 1972; head of the Yugoslav film festival in Pula and the executive of FEST in Belgrade from 1972 to 1974.

His short stories, essays and articles on film and the theatre were published in Politika, Student, Odjek, Kazalište, Jež, Beogradska nedelja, Borba, Sineast, Ekran, Književnost, Filmograf, YU film danas, Filmska kultura, Drama...

He is the author of the books Fini ljudi (Nice people, published by Zadruga pisaca, 1967), Kako zalazi sunce (As the sun sets, Zadruga pisaca, 1970), Gledanje u film (Watching in the film, published by YU film danas, 2000) and, with Gordana Zindović-Vukadinović, co-author of Pars pro toto, medijska pismenost za nastavnike osnovnih škola (Pars proto, media literacy for elementary school teachers, published by Centar za audiovizuelne medije – Medija fokus, 2001). His works is included in the anthology Jugoslovenska filmska misao 1920–1995 (Yugoslav film thought 1920–1995) edited by Several Franić.

He made short films Beograd na šoferšajbni (Belgrade on the windshield, the winner of the second prize at The first Yugoslav festival of the amateur films), Zima u Pragu (Winter in Prague; the winner of the third prize at the same festival), Oni dolaze (They are coming, on children who sing and play on the streets of Belgrade), Pijani brod (The Drunken ship), and the series of TV portraits: on academician Nikola Hajdin (TV Beograd), actor Raša Plaović (TV Beograd), film directors Žorž Skrigin (TV Beograd) and Žika Mitrović (TV Novi Sad), as well as film scriptwriter Ferenc Deak (TV Novi Sad).

For a decades Novaković has been cooperating with the children film amateurs in Serbia and former Yugoslavia. He took part in many discussions on film. He lectured on film dramaturgy to filmmakers, primary and secondary teachers, youths and children.

He has been awarded a great number of national (both Serbian and Yugoslav) as well as international recognitions.

References

External links 
  
 Association of Serbian Film Artists, official website
 Association of Serbian Playwrights, official website

1940 births
Living people
Acting theorists
Film people from Belgrade
Nikola Tesla
Serbian dramatists and playwrights
Serbian educators
Serbian film directors
Serbian satirists
Serbian screenwriters
Male screenwriters
University of Arts in Belgrade alumni